Sascha Traut (born 21 May 1985) is a German former professional footballer who played as a right midfielder.

Career
On 24 June 2009, he moved for free to SV Wacker Burghausen. On 31 August 2010, he was signed by VfR Aalen. On 6 May 2014, he signed a two-year contract to return to his old club Karlsruher SC.

He left VfR Aalen in summer 2019.

Honours
Karlsruher SC
 2. Bundesliga: 2006–07

VfR Aalen
 3. Liga runner-up: 2011–12

References

External links
 
 
 
 

1985 births
Living people
German footballers
Footballers from Karlsruhe
Association football midfielders
2. Bundesliga players
3. Liga players
Karlsruher SC players
TuS Koblenz players
Stuttgarter Kickers players
SV Wacker Burghausen players
VfR Aalen players
Würzburger Kickers players